"Snookeroo" is a song written by Elton John and Bernie Taupin and released by Ringo Starr on his 1974 album Goodnight Vienna.

Writing and release
The song, which concerns a happy-go-lucky lout from northern England, was written about Starr himself. Bernie Taupin backs this up by calling it "a simple biographical thing". Elton John recalled, "Bernie wrote really simple lyrics, very Ringo type lyrics and I tried to write a simple sort of melody to it". Elton John also plays piano on the track and provides the count-off.

The title refers to the billiards game snooker. Charting as a tag-along with "No No Song" in the US, it reached number three on the Billboard Hot 100. On the Cash Box chart, which listed single sides separately, it "bubbled under" at number 105.

The UK version of the single was released on 21 February 1975 with "Oo-Wee" on the B-side,; both tracks were taken from the album Goodnight Vienna.

Reception
Billboard described "Snookeroo" as "a perfect Ringo type cut" that is "an uptempo, happy song" with good use of horns and string instruments.  Cash Box said that "it shares [John's and Taupin's] usual hit qualities"  Ultimate Classic Rock critic Dave Swanson rated it Starr's 8th greatest solo song. The record failed to chart in the UK.

References
 Footnotes

 Citations

Ringo Starr songs
Apple Records singles
1975 singles
Songs with lyrics by Bernie Taupin
Songs with music by Elton John
Song recordings produced by Richard Perry
1974 songs